Magòria-La Campana is a railway station on the Llobregat–Anoia Line. It is located underneath Gran Via de les Corts Catalanes, in the Barcelona district of Sants-Montjuïc, in Catalonia, Spain. It was opened in 1997 near the original at-grade station, which operated between 1912 and 1974. It is served by Barcelona Metro line 8, Baix Llobregat Metro lines S33, S4 and S8, and commuter rail lines R5 and R6.

External links
 Information and photos of the station at trenscat.cat 
 Video on train operations at the station on YouTube

Railway stations in Spain opened in 1997
Barcelona Metro line 8 stations
Stations on the Llobregat–Anoia Line
Transport in Sants-Montjuïc
Railway stations located underground in Spain